The name Quiel has been used for three tropical cyclones in the Philippines by PAGASA in the Western Pacific.

 Tropical Depression Quiel (2003) – a short-lived system that was only recognized by PAGASA.
 Typhoon Nalgae (2011) (T1119, 23W, Quiel) – struck the Philippines as a Category 4 super typhoon and later affected Hainan, China as a weak tropical storm.
Typhoon Nakri (2019) (T1925, 25W, Quiel)- developed west of the main Philippine Islands and made landfall in Southern Vietnam.

Pacific typhoon set index articles